Crying is an American rock band from Purchase, New York formed in 2013. They consist of Elaiza Santos (vocals), Ryan Galloway (guitars, keyboards) and Kynwyn Sterling (drums). They have released two EPs and released their debut album Beyond the Fleeting Gales in October 2016.

History
Crying was formed in May 2013 at State University of New York at Purchase. The band was formed by Elaiza Santos (Vocals), Ryan Galloway (Guitars/Programming), and Nick Corbo (Drums). In 2013, the group released their debut EP Get Olde via Double Double Whammy. The band later released a remix EP of Get Olde with additional new tracks and b-sides titled Return to Olde World: Demos and B-Sides. 

In 2014 Crying released their second EP, Second Wind via Bandcamp. The band then signed to Run for Cover Records and reissued their first two EPs in a compilation, Get Olde/Second Wind. In 2015, Corbo departed the band to focus on his other band, LVL UP. In March, the band released a standalone single, "Patriot", via the band's Bandcamp, in which a remixed version would later be featured on the band's debut LP. 

In August 2016, the band announced their debut LP, Beyond the Fleeting Gales, would be released by Run For Cover on October 14, 2016. On August 24, 2016, the band released the track, "Wool in the Wash", from the upcoming LP.

In March 2017, the band performed a live session on Audiotree and it was released via streaming services.

In 2020, Ryan Galloway formed a band with Michelle Zauner called Bumper. The band released their debut EP pop songs 2020 on 4 September 2020.

Band members

Current members
Elaiza "Z" Santos - vocals (2013-present)
Ryan Galloway - guitar, synthesizer, Game Boy (2013-2017)
Kynwyn Sterling - drums (2017-present)

Former members
Nick Corbo - drums (2013-2017)

Discography

Studio albums

Extended plays

Singles

Compilation albums

Live albums

References

Musical groups from New York (state)
Musical groups established in 2013
Run for Cover Records artists
American indie pop groups
American synth-pop groups
American indie rock groups
Chiptune musical groups
2013 establishments in New York (state)